Solo or SOLO may refer to:

Arts and entertainment

Comics
 Solo (DC Comics), a DC comics series
 Solo, a 1996 mini-series from Dark Horse Comics

Characters
 Han Solo, a Star Wars character
 Jacen Solo, a Jedi in the non-canonical Star Wars Legends continuity
 Kylo Ren, real name Ben Solo, a Star Wars character
 Napoleon Solo, from the TV spy series Man from U.N.C.L.E.
 Sky Solo, from the comic book series 1963
 Solo (Marvel Comics), a fictional counter-terrorism operative

Films
 Solo (1969 film), directed by Jean-Pierre Mocky
 Solo (1972 film), directed by Mike Hoover
 Solo (1977 film), a New Zealand film 
 Solo (1984 film), starring Sandra Kerns
 Solo (1996 film), a science fiction action film
 Solo (2006 film), an Australian film written and directed by Morgan O'Neill
 Solo (2008 film), an Australian documentary film directed by David Michod and Jennifer Peedom
 Solo (2011 film), a Telugu-language film
 Solo (2013 film), a Canadian thriller
 Solo (2015 film), Uruguayan director Guillermo Rocamora's debut film
 Solo (2017 film), a Tamil-Malayalam film directed by Bejoy Nambiar
 Solo: A Star Wars Story, a 2018 Star Wars film featuring a young Han Solo
 Solo (2018 Spanish film), a 2018 Spanish adventure film starring Aura Garrido
 Solo (2022 film), a documentary film
 Solos (film), a 2007 Singaporean drama film

Literature
 Solo (Boyd novel), a 2013 James Bond novel by William Boyd
 Solo (Mason novel), a 1992 science fiction novel by Robert Mason
 Solo, a 1992 novel by Jill Mansell

Music
 Solo (music), a piece or section played or sung by a single performer

Groups
 Solo (American band), an R&B group from New York City
 Solo (Dutch band), a pop duo with Michiel Flamman and Simon Gitsels

Albums
 Solo (Kai Winding album), 1963
 Solo (Cecil Taylor album), 1973
 Solo (Jimmy Raney album), 1976 
 Solo (Don McLean album), 1976
 Solo (Kaipa album), 1978
 Solo (Egberto Gismonti album), 1979
 Solo (Opus album), 1985
 Solo (Solo album), 1995 album by the American band
 Solo (John Bunch album), 1996
 Solo (Leroy Jenkins album), 1998
 Solo (Hugh Cornwell album), 1999
 Solo (Mulgrew Miller album), 2000
 Solo (DC Talk album), 2001
 Solo (Brian Harvey album), 2002
 Solo (Oscar Peterson album), 2002
 Solo (Michel Camilo album), 2004
 Solo (Ricardo Arjona album), 2004
 Solo (Gonzalo Rubalcaba album), 2005
 Solo (António Pinho Vargas album), 2008
 Solo: Live from San Francisco, a 2009 album by McCoy Tyner
 Solo (Henry Grimes album), 2009
 Solo (Vijay Iyer album), 2010
 Solo (Tony Lucca album), 2011
 Solo (Lynne Arriale album), 2012
 Solo (soundtrack), from the 2017 film
 Solo (EP), a 2012 EP by Heo Young-saeng
 Solo (Anitta EP), 2018
 Solo: Reflections and Meditations on Monk, a 2017 album by Wadada Leo Smith
 So-Lo, a 1984 Danny Elfman album
 Solo 1: Standards, a 2001 album by pianist Franco D'Andrea
 Solo 2: Abstractions, a 2001 album by pianist Franco D'Andrea
 Solo 3: Woods, a 2001 album by pianist Franco D'Andrea
 Solo 4: Gato, a 2001 album by pianist Franco D'Andrea
 Solo 5: Duke, a 2001 album by pianist Franco D'Andrea
 Solo 6: Valzer Opera Natale, a 2001 album by pianist Franco D'Andrea
 Solo 7: Napoli, a 2001 album by pianist Franco D'Andrea
 Solo 8: Classic Jazz, a 2001 album by pianist Franco D'Andrea
 Solo 2.0, a 2011 album by Italian singer Marco Mengoni
 Solo II, a 2009 album by Portuguese composer António Pinho Vargas
 Solos (Matthew Friedberger album), a 2011 set of six albums

Compositions
 Solo (Stockhausen), composed in 1965–66 by Karlheinz Stockhausen
 Solos, Op. 18, by Auguste-Joseph Franchomme (1808–1884)

Songs
 "Solo" (A.B. Quintanilla song), 2012
 "Solo" (Alsou song), 2000
 "Solo" (Blanka song), 2022, the Poland entry for the Eurovision Song Contest 2023
 "Solo" (Clean Bandit song), 2018
 "Solo" (DD Smash song), 1982
 "Solo" (Frank Ocean song), 2016
 "Solo (Reprise) (Frank Ocean song)", 2016
 "Solo" (Iyaz song), 2010
 "Solo" (Jennie song), 2018
 "Solo (Vuelta al ruedo)", by Marco Mengoni, 2011
 "Solo", by Chew Lips, 2009
 "Solo", by Demi Lovato from Here We Go Again, 2009
 "Solo", by Ekhymosis from Niño Gigante, 1993
 "Solo", by Prince from Come, 1994
 "Solo", by The Story So Far from The Story So Far, 2015
 "Solos", by Tony Dize, 2009

Other music
 Solo, a division on an organ console of a pipe organ

Television
 Solo (television pilot), 1964 television pilot movie for The Man from U.N.C.L.E.
 Solo (TV series), a British sitcom starring Felicity Kendal
 "Solo" (PEN15), a 2019 episode of the American comedy streaming television series
 Solos (TV series), an anthology drama streaming television series

Other arts and entertainment
 Solo (dance), an individual performance
 Solo (concert residency), a concert residency by Filipina singer Regine Velasquez
 Dance Dance Revolution Solo, a game sub-series of Dance Dance Revolution by Konami

Card games 
 American Solo, often just called Solo
 Denver Solo, variant of Six-Bid Solo
 English Solo, the game of Solo Whist
 German Solo, often just called Solo
 Progressive Solo, same as Denver Solo
 Solo whist, a card game also known as Solo
 Slough (card game), also called Solo

Brands and enterprises
 Solo (Australian soft drink), with lemon taste
 Solo (debit card), a British brand of cash card
 Solo (Norwegian soft drink), with orange taste
 Solo (restaurant), Dutch Michelin starred restaurant
 Solo, a Turkish brand of paper products owned by Georgia-Pacific
 Solo Beverage Company, a soft drink manufacturer in Trinidad and Tobago
 Solo Cup Company, an American manufacturer of consumer packaging products acquired by Dart Container in 2012
 Solo Foods, an American food company
 Solo Mobile, a communications company
 Solo Oil, former Australian oil company
 SOLO Sušice, a Czech matches company

Education
 Stonehearth Open Learning Opportunities (SOLO), a school in Conway, New Hampshire, U.S.
 Structure of observed learning outcome (SOLO), an education taxonomy
 Search Oxford Libraries Online (SOLO), an online union catalogue of the Bodleian Library of Oxford University

People
 Solo (surname), people and fictional characters
 DJ Solo, real name Dave Abrams, American DJ, producer, rapper and visual artist
 Shawn Fonteno (born 1968), nicknamed "Solo", American actor and rapper
 Gary McKinnon (born 1966), nicknamed "Solo", British hacker

Places
 Solo, Fasa, Iran, a village
 Solo, Arkansas, United States, an unincorporated community
 Solo, Missouri, United States, an unincorporated community
 Cerro Solo or El Solo, a volcano in the Andes
 Solo Nunatak, Victoria Land, Antarctic
 Solo River, the longest river in the Indonesian island of Java
 Surakarta, Indonesia, a city known colloquially as Solo

Sports
 Solo, autocross events sanctioned by the SCCA
 Solo climbing, also known as soloing
 Solo racing, a form of Motorcycle speedway racing

Transport

Aviation
 First solo flight of a trainee pilot
 Bailey Solo, a British paramotor design
 Fresh Breeze Solo, a German paramotor design

Automobiles
 Optare Solo, a British-built midibus
 Panther Solo, a British sports car

Watercraft
 Solo (dinghy), a racing sailboat designed by Jack Holt in 1956
 Solo (yacht), an Australian ex-ocean racing yacht
 MV Solo, a 1977 Greenpeace ship

Other uses
Solar Orbiter (SolO), a 2020 space mission
 Solo (magazine), a Swedish magazine
 SOLO, a computer built by Philco for the United States National Security Agency

See also
 Alone (disambiguation)
 Soho (disambiguation)
 Solo Solo, PUFFY's 1997 album
 K-Solo (born 1968), real name Kevin Madison, American rapper